The 2012–13 season was Associazione Calcio Milan's 79th in the Serie A and 30th consecutive season in the top flight of Italian football. Milan strived to regain the Serie A title, which they lost to Juventus in the previous season. The Rossoneri also competed in UEFA Champions League, as well as the Coppa Italia.

The season marks the beginning of a new era for Milan, with a host of veterans leaving the club in the summer, including Alessandro Nesta, Filippo Inzaghi, Gennaro Gattuso, Gianluca Zambrotta, Mark van Bommel, and Clarence Seedorf. Also leaving were star players Thiago Silva, Zlatan Ibrahimović, Antonio Cassano during the summer, and Alexandre Pato in the winter.

Over the first 6 months of the season, Milan struggled a lot, losing a total of 9 games (7 in Serie A and 2 in the Champions League), as well as 4 pre-season friendlies. However, in the second half of the season, the team managed to gain momentum, went on a 14-game unbeaten run in Serie A, and eventually finished in the 3rd place, securing a spot in the 2013–14 UEFA Champions League qualification play-off, which became the club's main objective for the season following the team's elimination in the round of 16 of the previous edition of the competition.

Players

 

(on loan from Villarreal)

(on loan from Barcelona)
(captain)

 (vice-captain)

Pre-season and friendlies

Milan began their pre-season training at Milanello on Monday, 9 July 2012. The Rossoneri played their first set of friendlies in Bari on 21, July, 2012 to contest the TIM Trophy consisting of three games, of 45 minutes each, against rivals Internazionale and Juventus. Milan's first game was against Juventus, they started well but The Old Lady were awarded a penalty after Bakaye Traoré tackled Mirko Vučinić inside the box in the 31st minute, he then converted the spot-kick which subsequently resulted in Milan's first loss. Their second game was against Inter, Il Diavolo would go ahead in the 16th minute through a Stephan El Shaarawy strike, but Nerazzuri would come back to win through a Fredy Guarín header in the 25th minute, and with Rodrigo Palacio scoring the tie-breaker in the 34th minute, forcing Milan to finish last in the competition with two losses.

On Tuesday, 24 July 2012, Milan played German side Schalke 04 at the Veltins-Arena in Gelsenkirchen, in a balanced match of offense and defense, Urby Emanuelson scored in the 62nd minute to break the stalemate, his sole strike would go on and win the friendly match for the Rossoneri. On Saturday, 28 July 2012, Milan contended in the World Football Challenge, playing a friendly against 2011–12 UEFA Champions League winners, Chelsea, in Miami, Milan looked to be physically dominated by the Blues in the early stages, but became the livelier of the two sides later on, and in the second half, in the 68th minute, after a clinical counter by the Rossoneri, Kevin-Prince Boateng played a perfect through ball to Urby Emanuelson drawing two defenders before passing the ball off to Stephan El Shaarawy. El Shaarawy's subsequent shot was parried by Petr Čech into Emanuelson's path who struck it into the net for the only goal in the game, and a second win for Milan.

Milan played Honduran side Olimpia on Saturday, 4 August in Massachusetts. Milan took the lead in the 24th minute when Robinho shot a low effort from outside the box into the bottom left corner of the goal. Antonio Nocerino would then score the second goal from a Robinho assist and his second, Milan's third, from an Ignazio Abate low cross after drawing the keeper out of his goal in the 37 and 44th minutes, respectively, although Olimpia would pull one back through José Escalante in the 72nd minute. Milan next played Spanish champions Real Madrid in the World Football Challenge at Yankee Stadium in New York on Wednesday, 8 August. Both teams started with strong lineups but it was Madrid who took the through Ángel Di María in the 24th minute. Robinho managed to equalise for Milan nine minutes later as both teams went into half time level. Milan made nine changes to the side after halftime. Milan were unable to keep the same rhythm, however, as Cristiano Ronaldo scored two goals in the 49th and 66th minutes and goals from Sergio Ramos and José Callejón in the 81st and 89th minute of the match damaged Milan to a heavy 5–1 defeat in the match.

A week later, Milan played their final pre-season game against Juventus in the annual Trofeo Berlusconi at the San Siro on Sunday, 19 August. Robinho opened the scoring for Milan after netting home in the ninth minute. Claudio Marchisio, however, managed to equalize four minutes later and Juventus went into the break with the lead with Arturo Vidal slipping the ball home three minutes before halftime. In the second half, Milan made changes to try to get back into the game but Alessandro Matri netted Juventus' third goal of the night in the 64th minute. Robinho managed to reduce the deficit with a penalty goal 13 minutes before time. Milan had chances to tie the game but it was not enough as Juventus clinched the Trofeo Luigi Berlusconi.

Competitions

Serie A

The fixtures for the 2012–13 Serie A were announced on 26 July 2012. The season started on Sunday 26 August 2012 with Milan taking on Sampdoria at the San Siro, it ends Sunday 19 May 2013 with a match away against Siena. Three midweek fixtures were planned, 26 September, 31 October and on 8 May, while the winter break is planned for 23 December to 5 January. The first international break took place the weekend of 8–9 September, which was after the second round of matches, rather than after the first as has happened in recent seasons.

League table

Results summary

Results by round

Matches

Coppa Italia

For the 14th season in a row, Milan will start the Coppa Italia directly in the round of 16, as one of the eight best seeded teams.

UEFA Champions League

Group stage

Milan began their UEFA Champions League campaign in the group stage after finishing runner-up in the 2011–12 Serie A season. Due to their UEFA coefficient, they were seeded in Pot 1, among the best eight teams. The draw for the preliminary round took place in Montecarlo on Thursday, 30 August 2012. Milan were drawn against Spanish side Málaga, as well as Belgian and Russian champions, Anderlecht and Zenit Saint Petersburg respectively.

Knockout phase

Round of 16

Squad statistics

Appearances, goals and disciplinary record
Updated 30 June 2013.
{| class="wikitable sortable" style="text-align:center"
|-
!rowspan="1" valign="bottom"|No.
!rowspan="1" valign="bottom"|Pos.
!rowspan="1" valign="bottom"|Name
!width="36"|
!width="36"|
!width="36"|
!width="36"|
!width="36"|
!width="36"|
!width="36"|
!width="36"|
!width="36"|
!width="36"|
!width="36"|
!width="36"|
!width="36"|
!width="36"|
!width="36"|
|-
|align="left"|1||align="left"|||align="left"| Marco Amelia
|10||11||0||1||1||0||1||1||0||12||13||0||1||0||0
|-
|align="left"|2||align="left"|||align="left"| Mattia De Sciglio
|25||27||0||1||1||0||4||4||0||30||32||0||1||0||0
|-
|align="left"|4||align="left"|||align="left"| Sulley Muntari
|11||15||1||0||0||0||1||2||1||12||17||2||2||0||0
|-
|align="left"|5||align="left"|||align="left"| Philippe Mexès
|25||25||1||1||1||0||6||6||1||32||32||2||14||0||0
|-
|align="left"|7||align="left"|||align="left"| Robinho
|11||23||2||1||1||0||0||2||0||12||26||2||1||0||0
|-
|align="left"|8||align="left"|||align="left"| Antonio Nocerino
|20||26||2||0||0||0||2||3||0||22||29||2||4||0||0
|-
|align="left"|9||align="left|||align="left"| Alexandre Pato1
|3||4||0||0||0||0||1||3||2||4||7||2||0||0||0
|-
|align="left"|10||align="left"|||align="left"| Kevin-Prince Boateng
|25||29||2||1||1||0||6||6||1||32||36||3||6||1||1
|-
|align="left"|11||align="left"|||align="left"| Giampaolo Pazzini
|15||30||15||2||2||0||4||4||0||21||36||15||6||0||0
|-
|align="left"|12||align="left"|||align="left"| Bakaye Traoré
|1||7||0||0||1||0||0||1||0||1||9||0||1||0||0
|-
|align="left"|13||align="left"|||align="left"| Francesco Acerbi1
|5||6||0||2||2||0||2||2||0||8||10||0||0||0||0
|-
|align="left"|14||align="left"|||align="left"| Rodney Strasser1
|0||0||0||1||1||0||0||0||0||1||1||0||1||0||0
|-
|align="left"|14||align="left"|||align="left"| Bartosz Salamon2
|0||0||0||0||0||0||0||0||0||0||0||0||0||0||0
|-
|align="left"|15||align="left"|||align="left"| Djamel Mesbah1
|1||1||0||0||0||0||1||1||0||2||2||0||0||0||0
|-
|align="left"|16||align="left"|||align="left"| Mathieu Flamini
|15||18||4||1||1||0||3||3||0||19||22||4||5||0||0
|-
|align="left"|17||align="left"|||align="left"| Cristián Zapata
|22||23||0||1||1||0||4||4||0||27||28||0||5||2||0
|-
|align="left"|18||align="left"|||align="left"| Riccardo Montolivo
|31||32||4||1||1||0||6||6||0||38||39||4||9||0||0
|-
|align="left"|19||align="left"|||align="left"| M'Baye Niang
|9||20||0||0||2||1||1||2||0||10||24||1||2||0||0
|-
|align="left"|20||align="left"|||align="left"| Ignazio Abate
|25||27|0||2||2||0||4||4||0||31||33||0||1||0||0
|-
|align="left"|21||align="left"|||align="left"| Kévin Constant
|20||25||0||0||0||0||4||5||0||24||30||0||2||0||0
|-
|align="left"|22||align="left"|||align="left"| Bojan
|5||19||3||1||2||0||4||5||0||10||27||3||1||0||0
|-
|align="left"|23||align="left"|||align="left"| Massimo Ambrosini
|16||20||0||1||1||0||4||4||0||21||25||0||8||0||0
|-
|align="left"|25||align="left"|||align="left"| Daniele Bonera
|13||13||0||0||0||0||4||4||0||17||17||0||7||0||0
|-
|align="left"|28||align="left"|||align="left"| Urby Emanuelson1
|8||12||1||2||2||0||5||5||1||15||19||2||2||0||0
|-
|align="left"|32||align="left"|||align="left"| Christian Abbiati
|28||28||0||1||1||0||7||7||0||36||36||0||3||0||0
|-
|align="left"|34||align="left"|||align="left"| Nigel de Jong
|10||12||1||0||0||0||4||4||0||14||16||1||4||0||0
|-
|align="left"|35||align="left"|||align="left"| Dídac Vilà
|0||0||0||0||0||0||0||0||0||0||0||0||0||0||0
|-
|align="left"|45||align="left"|||align="left"| Mario Balotelli2
|12||13||12||0||0||0||0||0||0||12||13||12||3||0||0
|-
|align="left"|55||align="left"|||align="left"| Adrià Carmona1
|0||0||0||0||0||0||0||0||0||0||0||0||0||0||0
|-
|align="left"|57||align="left"|||align="left"| Mattia Valoti1
|0||0||0||0||0||0||0||0||0||0||0||0||0||0||0
|-
|align="left"|59||align="left"|||align="left"| Gabriel
|0||0||0||0||0||0||0||0||0||0||0||0||0||0||0
|-
|align="left"|76||align="left"|||align="left"| Mario Yepes
|13||14||0||1||1||1||1||3||0||15||18||1||8||0||0
|-
|align="left"|77||align="left"|||align="left"| Luca Antonini
|5||6||0||1||1||0||2||2||0||8||9||0||1||0||0
|-
|align="left"|81||align="left"|||align="left"| Cristian Zaccardo2
|0||1||0||0||0||0||0||0||0||0||1||0||0||0||0
|-
|align="left"|92||align="left"|||align="left"| Stephan El Shaarawy
|34||37||16||1||1||1||6||7||2||41||45||19||4||0||0
|-
|align="left"|–||align="left"|–||align="left"|Own goals
|–||-||2||-||–||0||-||–||1||-||–||3||-||-||-
|- class="sortbottom"

1 Player left the club during the season
2 Player joined the club during the season

Transfers
During the summer transfer window, Milan parted ways with four club legends: Gennaro Gattuso, Alessandro Nesta, Clarence Seedorf and Filippo Inzaghi. Mark van Bommel also decided to leave Milan to return to the Netherlands with PSV. The first inward transfers of the season saw Riccardo Montolivo join on a Bosman transfer from Fiorentina after having failed to complete the transfer in the previous year, while Bakaye Traoré joined from Ligue 1 side Nancy. Milan also acquired promising young goalkeeper Gabriel, who joined from Brazilian club Cruzeiro. He was followed by the arrivals of Francesco Acerbi, on co-ownership, and Kévin Constant on loan, the latter as a replacement for the injured Sulley Muntari, both from Genoa on the same day. On 14 July, Milan accepted a €42 million bid for defender Thiago Silva from Paris Saint-Germain. Three days later, PSG submitted a €23 million bid for Swedish forward Zlatan Ibrahimović, which Milan accepted. The next major transfer saw Giampaolo Pazzini transfer to Milan from crosstown rivals Internazionale and Antonio Cassano heading the opposite way, with an additional fee of around €7 million. The final days of the transfer window saw Milan reinforce the squad with 17-year-old striker M'Baye Niang from Caen, 21-year-old forward Bojan from Roma on loan and combative defensive midfielder Nigel de Jong from English champions Manchester City.

In the winter transfer window, Milan parted ways with long-time striker Alexandre Pato. They also traded co-ownership with Genoa for 50 percent of Francesco Acerbi's rights in exchange for 50 percent of Kévin Constant's rights. On the last day of the transfer window, Mario Balotelli signed for Milan after he was bought from Manchester City. Milan also sold veteran goalkeeper Ferdinando Coppola to Torino and bought youngster Bartosz Salamon from Serie B side Brescia.

In

Out

Out on loan

References

A.C. Milan seasons
Milan
Milan